Khaled Chentout (born 29 March 1984) is an Algerian handball coach for TIF Viking. 

He competed for the Algerian national team at the 2015 World Men's Handball Championship in Qatar, which was his first appearance at the World Championships.

References

1984 births
Living people
Algerian male handball players
21st-century Algerian people